Curtis Lake is a lake in Clark County in the U.S. state of Washington. The lake, near the confluence of Salmon Creek and Lake River, is northwest of the community of Felida.

The lake is home to two nonindigenous aquatic species; Perca flavescens  (yellow perch) and Pomoxis annularis (white crappie).

Curtis Creek

The lake's single outlet is Curtis Creek which empties into Salmon Creek.

See also
 List of lakes in Washington

References

Lakes of Washington (state)
Lakes of Clark County, Washington